Phalonidia coreana is a species of moth of the family Tortricidae. It is found in China (Guizhou, Henan) and Korea.

The wingspan is about 14 mm.

References

Moths described in 2006
Phalonidia